is a Japanese professional shogi player ranked 8-dan.

Early life
Eisaku Tomioka was born in Yokohama, Kanagawa Prefecture on May 19, 1964. He learned how to play shogi as a kindergartener from his father, and was the best player in his class as a fifth-grade elementary school student.  Looking for stronger competition, he decided to apply for the Japan Shogi Association's apprentice school. Tomioka entered the apprentice school at the rank of 6-kyū under the guidance of shogi professional Nobuyuki Ōuchi in November 1978, was promoted to 1-dan in 1981, and finally obtained  full professional status and the rank of 4-dan in December 1984.

Promotion history 
The promotion history of Tomioka is as follows:
 6-kyū: 1978
 1-dan: 1981
 4-dan: December 18, 1984
 5-dan: April 1, 1986
 6-dan: April 1, 1988
 7-dan: April 1, 1992
 8-dan: December 20, 2002

Awards and honors
Tomioka received the Japan Shogi Association's Annual Shogi Awards for "Best New Player" and "Best Winning Percentage" in 1985. He also received the Kōzō Masuda Award in 2016 for his development of the  Tomioka Bishop Exchange, Reclining Silver.

In 2009, he received the JSA's "25 Years Service Award" in recognition of being an active professional for twenty-five years.

References

External links
ShogiHub: Professional Player Info · Tomioka, Eisaku

1964 births
Japanese shogi players
Living people
Professional shogi players
People from Yokohama
Professional shogi players from Kanagawa Prefecture
Recipients of the Kōzō Masuda Award